Glenlara GAA is a Gaelic Athletic Association club based in the rural area of Taur, Newmarket, County Cork, Ireland. The club plays Gaelic football in the Duhallow division competitions. 
 Glenlara GAA Club was founded in 1939 by D.A. Daly, P.Shine and R O'Keeffe. Other clubs in the Glenlara area include Newmarket, Boherbue and Kiskeam. In recent years Glenlara GAA have established a permanent home at the old school in Glashykinleen which is central to Taur and Glenlara area. The old Glashykinleen school is now their changing rooms and they have developed a playing pitch adjacent to this. Glenlara won the Duhallow Junior B Football Championship Final Group 2 in 2011 and again in 2013.

Honours
 Duhallow Junior A Football Championship 
  Runners-Up (2): 1956, 1958
 Examiner Cups Winners
  Winners (3): 1954, 1958, 1970
 Duhallow Junior B Football Championship
  Winners (4): 1941, 1950, 1961, 1981
 Duhallow Junior B Football (Group 2) Championship
  Winners (2): 2011, 2013
 Duhallow Junior B League
  Winners (2): 1984, 1988
 Duhallow Under-21 B Football League
  Winners (1): 1992

See also
 Duhallow GAA

References

Gaelic games clubs in County Cork
Gaelic football clubs in County Cork